The 1990 Survivor Series was the fourth annual Survivor Series professional wrestling pay-per-view (PPV) event produced by the World Wrestling Federation (WWF, now WWE). It took place on Thanksgiving Day on November 22, 1990, at the Hartford Civic Center in Hartford, Connecticut. Seven matches were contested at the event, including one dark match before the live broadcast.

This event is well known for the on-screen debut of The Undertaker who went on to become one of the most legendary figures within the company. The Undertaker replaced Bad News Brown who had left the WWF after Vince McMahon failed to live up to his promise to make him the company's first black champion. In addition, Sgt. Slaughter, who then portrayed an Iraqi sympathizer, insulted servicemen stationed in Iraq for Thanksgiving during Operation Desert Shield. In an interview, Randy Savage challenged The Ultimate Warrior for the WWF World Heavyweight Championship. Haku replaced Rick Rude, who had left the WWF over a pay dispute. In the storyline, he was suspended by WWF President Jack Tunney for insulting the mother of the Big Boss Man. Boris Zhukov replaced Akeem who had left the WWF in October.

The Undertaker would wrestle for the WWF (renamed to WWE in 2002) for the next 30 years, setting a company record for longevity. He would become one of their most important and beloved stars, eventually reaching iconic status. His retirement ceremony took place at the 2020 Survivor Series, exactly 30 years later.

Production

Background
Survivor Series is an annual gimmick pay-per-view (PPV), produced every November by the World Wrestling Federation (WWF, now WWE) since 1987. In what has become the second longest running pay-per-view event in history (behind WWE's WrestleMania), it is one of the promotion's original four pay-per-views, along with WrestleMania, Royal Rumble, and SummerSlam, which were dubbed the "Big Four". Continuing the tradition of the previous years' events, the fourth event in the Survivor Series chronology only featured Survivor Series matches, which are tag team elimination matches. The event was scheduled to be held on Thanksgiving Day on November 22, 1990, at the Hartford Civic Center in Hartford, Connecticut.

Storylines
The card included matches that resulted from scripted storylines, in which wrestlers portrayed heroes, villains, or less distinguishable characters in scripted events that built tension and culminated in a wrestling match or series of matches. Results were predetermined by WWF's writers, with storylines produced on their weekly television shows.

Aftermath
Crowd reaction to The Gobbledy Gooker was extremely negative, with fans loudly booing as the costumed Héctor Guerrero danced in the ring with announcer Gene Okerlund. Although the character made a handful of appearances in taped promos following the Survivor Series, the Gobbledy Gooker soon disappeared and was not mentioned again until the Gimmick Battle Royal at WrestleMania X-Seven. Several years later, WrestleCrap used the name for its "Gooker Award", presented for the worst gimmicks, storylines, or events in wrestling.

Sgt. Slaughter and Randy Savage both challenged the Ultimate Warrior for the WWF Championship. Slaughter and his manager, General Adnan, also cut several anti-American, pro-Iraqi promos – all airing at a time when the United States was engaged in Operation Desert Shield, all to build up heat for his match against Warrior at the 1991 Royal Rumble, held two days after the start of the war against Iraq. Slaughter – with help from both Savage and his manager, Sensational Sherri – won the title from Warrior at the Royal Rumble. Warrior defeated Savage in a career-ending match at Wrestlemania VII after which Savage turned face and reunited with former manager Miss Elizabeth, ultimately winning back the belt a year later at Wrestlemania VIII. Savage and Warrior fought one more time for the title at SummerSlam (1992) in a match plagued by interference from Ric Flair and Mr Perfect.

Hogan went on to focus on wrapping up his feud with Earthquake with a series of stretcher matches, which Hogan won, before going on to challenge Slaughter for the WWF title.

Since the formation of Demolition in 1987, they had been compared to the Legion of Doom (LOD). The feud between the LOD and Demolition (which by now was Crush and Smash) continued to rage into the end of 1990, with LOD eventually proving decisively they were the better team. (In part, the feud had not had the anticipated intensity because of Ax's reduced role in the tag team due to health problems.) Demolition's last pay-per-view appearance was at WrestleMania VII, where the team lost to Genichiro Tenryu and Koji Kitao. LOD eventually became WWF Tag Team Champions.

The Undertaker quickly got over with fans as he easily handled lower-card competition during his first months in the WWF. He started his first main-event feud with The Ultimate Warrior shortly after WrestleMania VII. The Undertaker would wrestle for the WWF (renamed to WWE in 2002) for the next 30 years, setting a company record for longevity. He would become one of their most important and beloved stars, eventually reaching iconic status. His retirement ceremony took place at the 2020 Survivor Series, exactly 30 years later, and headlined the WWE Hall of Fame Class of 2022.

Results

Eliminations

Other on-screen personnel

Notes

References

Sources

Survivor Series '90 Review
hoffco-inc.com – Survivor Series '90 review
1990 Survivor Series Results

External links
Official 1990 Survivor Series page at WWE.com

1990
1990 in Connecticut
Events in Hartford, Connecticut
Professional wrestling in Hartford, Connecticut
1990 WWF pay-per-view events
November 1990 events in the United States